Daniel Steven Kowalski   (born 2 July 1975) is an Australian former middle- and long-distance swimmer specialising in freestyle events. He competed in the Olympic Games in 200-, 400- and 1,500-metre individual freestyle events and in the 4 × 200-metre freestyle relay. At the 1996 Summer Olympics, he was the first man in 92 years to earn medals in all of the 200-, 400- and 1500-metre freestyle events. Kowalski, alongside Livinia Nixon, hosted the short-lived TV show Plucka's Place in 1997. Kowalski is perhaps best known for having been a perpetual runner-up to fellow Australians Kieren Perkins and Grant Hackett, who were, respectively, the world's best 1500-metre freestyle competitors during the earlier and later parts of Kowalski's career. He was an Australian Institute of Sport scholarship holder. Daniel's coaches included Denis Cotterell and Bill Nelson.

Olympic medals 
 2000 Summer Olympics: gold medal in the 4 × 200-metre freestyle relay (Kowalski was replaced in the final by Ian Thorpe but as a swimmer in the qualifying heat, he shares the gold medal)
 1996 Summer Olympics: silver medal in the 1500-metre freestyle, bronze medal in the 400 m freestyle, and bronze medal in the 200-metre freestyle

World championship results 
 1998 World Aquatics Championships: bronze medal in the 1500-metre freestyle
 1994 World Aquatics Championships: gold medal in the 4 × 200-metre relay, silver medal in the 1500-metre freestyle

World records 
Kowalski was part of the world record-setting Australian gold medal 4 × 200-metre relay team at the 1998 Commonwealth Games. Kowalski also holds 400-metre freestyle long-course masters world record in the 30-to-34 age group which he set on 2 May 2009 in a time of 3:58.42.

Retirement 
Kowalski announced his retirement from competitive swimming on 8 May 2002. He studied sports marketing at Bond University, graduating in 2003. He was named as an assistant swimming coach at the University of Wisconsin–Madison in 2007, and also won the 2007 Pier to Pub 1.2 km open-water swim held annually in Lorne, Australia.

In February 2004, he was the host of an overnight program on SEN 1116 with former South East Melbourne Magic basketballer Andrew Parkinson. In May 2007 Kowalski appeared as one of the celebrity performers on the celebrity reality singing competition It Takes Two.

In April 2010 Kowalski announced that he is gay. Kowalski says he was inspired to come out by Welsh rugby player Gareth Thomas, who announced the previous December that he was gay. He said "I felt really compelled to do it because it's very tough to live a closeted existence". In 2010, Kowalski was selected by readers of samesame.com.au as one of the 25 most influential gay Australians.

See also
 List of Commonwealth Games medallists in swimming (men)
 List of LGBT Olympians
 List of Olympic medalists in swimming (men)

References

External links 
 ABC Online News: Athletes – Daniel Kowalski
 Australian Swimming | Swimmer Profile 
 Daniel Kowalski announces his retirement
 
 

1975 births
Living people
Australian male freestyle swimmers
Bond University alumni
World record setters in swimming
Gay sportsmen
LGBT swimmers
Australian LGBT sportspeople
Olympic bronze medalists for Australia
Olympic gold medalists for Australia
Olympic bronze medalists in swimming
Olympic silver medalists for Australia
Olympic swimmers of Australia
Swimmers at the 1996 Summer Olympics
Swimmers at the 2000 Summer Olympics
World Aquatics Championships medalists in swimming
Australian Institute of Sport swimmers
Medalists at the FINA World Swimming Championships (25 m)
Medalists at the 2000 Summer Olympics
Medalists at the 1996 Summer Olympics
Commonwealth Games gold medallists for Australia
Olympic gold medalists in swimming
Olympic silver medalists in swimming
Commonwealth Games medallists in swimming
Swimmers at the 1994 Commonwealth Games
Swimmers at the 1998 Commonwealth Games
Recipients of the Medal of the Order of Australia
Male long-distance swimmers
21st-century LGBT people
Medallists at the 1994 Commonwealth Games
Medallists at the 1998 Commonwealth Games